This is the motion picture soundtrack to Martin Brest film Scent of a Woman with Al Pacino and Chris O'Donnell.

Track listing

References

1993 soundtrack albums
Drama film soundtracks
MCA Records soundtracks